Shoofly pie is a type of American pie made with molasses associated with Pennsylvania Dutch cuisine. While shoo-fly pie has been a staple of Moravian, Mennonite and Amish foodways, there is scant evidence concerning its origins, and most of the folktales concerning the pie are legendary, including the persistent legend that the name comes from flies being attracted to the sweet filling. 

The name "shoo-fly pie" was borrowed from a brand of molasses that was popular in parts of the US during the late 19th century. Possibly related to the Jenny Lind pie (a soft gingerbread pie), it may have originated among the Pennsylvania Dutch in the 1880s as molasses crumb cake, and is sometimes called molasses crumb pie.  It was traditionally served not as a dessert pie, but as a breakfast food with hot coffee. The modern form of shoofly pie as a crumb cake served in pie crust was a post-Civil War innovation, when cast iron cookware and stoves made pie crust more accessible for home cooks.

Description 

Shoofly pie has been described as a crumb cake baked in a pie crust. The primary ingredients of the filling are molasses, brown sugar, and water. Serving the cake in pie crust made it easier for people to eat it with their hands in the 19th century. 

It comes in two different versions: wet-bottom and dry-bottom. The dry-bottom version is baked until fully set and results in a more cake-like consistency throughout. The wet-bottom version is set like cake at the top where it was mixed in with the crumbs, but the very bottom is a stickier, gooier custard-like consistency.  Recipes differentiating between wet and dry versions appeared in the early 20th century; the dry version was suitable for dunking in a cup of coffee.

History 
Shoofly pie began as a crust-less molasses cake called Centennial cake in 1876, to celebrate the 100th anniversary of the signing of the Declaration of Independence in Philadelphia. There is no evidence of it being made before the American Civil War. In the 1880s, home bakers added a crust to make it easier to eat alongside a cup of coffee in the morning, without plates and forks. Precursors include Jenny Lind pie, a type of gingerbread cake that was named for the famed Swedish opera star, Jenny Lind after her tour of America in the 1850s. Because shoofly pie traditionally contains molasses but no eggs, historians conclude that it was typically baked during the winter, when chickens laid fewer eggs and molasses could be stored in the cold weather without fear of it fermenting. The use of baking powder places its invention firmly after the Civil War and in the 1870s, when Pennsylvania Dutch bakers began using baking powder.

Variations 

A Montgomery pie is similar to a shoofly pie, except lemon juice is used in the bottom layer. Treacle tart is a pie with a filling made from light treacle.

Name 
The modern name comes from a particular brand of molasses from Philadelphia, Shoofly Molasses. The name shoofly pie was used in the 1880s, but its first appearance in print was after World War I. The Shoofly brand of molasses was named after a popular circus animal that toured in Pennsylvania in the 19th century, Shoofly the Boxing Mule. The mule, in turn, may have been named after a song that became popular half a century before: "Shoo Fly, Don't Bother Me".  The pie is mentioned in the song "Shoo-Fly Pie and Apple Pan Dowdy," popularized by Dinah Shore in the 1940s.

Shoofly pie is called Melassich Riwwelboi or Melassichriwwelkuche (molasses crumb cake) in the Pennsylvania Dutch language.  Before its modern name became popular during the 20th century, it was molasses crumb pie or soda rivvel cake (rivels are lumps of food).

See also

Pie in American cuisine

References

External links
"Pebble-Dash" or Shoo-Fly Pie, a page from a 1915 cookbook (Mary at the Farm and Book of Recipes Compiled During Her Visit Among the "Pennsylvania Germans") at the website of the Michigan State University Library
Shoo-fly, don't Amish me, a March 2006 Yale Daily News article on the pie which includes a recipe

American pies
Pennsylvania Dutch cuisine
Sweet pies
Molasses